No País das Amazonas is a 1922 Brazilian silent documentary film directed by Agesilau De Araujo and Silvino Santos.

The film was notable in that it was one of the earliest to document the Amazon Rainforest on camera and present it to a wider audience and documents the local economies of the Amazonian Indians, examining production lines and workers in factories. It also portrays fishing on the Amazon River as a way of life, and shows how the locals prepare the fish for sale with salt. Later on, the film also examines rubber plantations in the rainforest and how the locals make use of the natural reserves for export.

The film premiered on 12 January 1922 in Rio de Janeiro.

External links

Citations 

1922 documentary films
1920s crime films
1922 films
Films set in the Amazon
Black-and-white documentary films
Brazilian documentary films
Brazilian silent films